was a Japanese actress.

Filmography

Films
 Akō Rōshi: Ten no Maki, Chi no Maki (1956)
 Magic Boy (1959)
 Bushido, Samurai Saga (1963)
 Karafuto 1945 Summer Hyosetsu no Mon (1974)
 Nichiren (1979)
 Pecoross' Mother and Her Days (2013)

Television
 Taikōki (1965)
 Kinpachi-sensei (1979–2011)
 Onna Taikōki (1981), as Naka (Hideyoshi's mother)
 Oshin (1983), as Hisa Kamiyama
 Toshiie to Matsu (2002), as Ume

Honours
Medal with Purple Ribbon (1993)
Order of the Precious Crown, 4th Class, Wisteria (1998)

References

External links
 

1924 births
2018 deaths
Japanese film actresses
Japanese television actresses
Japanese people from Manchukuo
Recipients of the Medal with Purple Ribbon